Temozolomide (TMZ), sold under the brand name Temodar among others, is a medication used to treat brain tumors such as glioblastoma and anaplastic astrocytoma. It is taken by mouth or via intravenous infusion.

The most common side effects with temozolomide are nausea, vomiting, constipation, loss of appetite, alopecia (hair loss), headache, fatigue, convulsions (seizures), rash, neutropenia or lymphopenia (low white-blood-cell counts), and thrombocytopenia (low blood platelet counts). People receiving the solution for infusion may also have injection-site reactions, such as pain, irritation, itching, warmth, swelling and redness, as well as bruising.

Temozolomide is an alkylating agent used to treat serious brain cancers; most commonly as second-line treatments for astrocytoma and as the first-line treatment for glioblastoma. Olaparib in combination with temozolomide demonstrated substantial clinical activity in relapsed small cell lung cancer.

Medical uses
In the United States temozolomide is indicated for the treatment of adults with newly diagnosed glioblastoma multiforme concomitantly with radiotherapy and subsequently as monotherapy treatment; or adults with refractory anaplastic astrocytoma who have experienced disease progression on a drug regimen containing nitrosourea and procarbazine.

In the European Union temozolomide is indicated for adults with newly diagnosed glioblastoma multiforme concomitantly with radiotherapy and subsequently as monotherapy treatment; or children from the age of three years, adolescents and adults with malignant glioma, such as glioblastoma multiforme or anaplastic astrocytoma, showing recurrence or progression after standard therapy.

Contraindications
Temozolomide is contraindicated in people with hypersensitivity to it or to the similar drug dacarbazine. The use of temozolomide is not recommended in people with severe myelosuppression.

Adverse effects
The most common side effect is bone marrow suppression. The most common non-hematological adverse effects associated with temozolomide are nausea and vomiting, which are either self-limiting or readily controlled with standard antiemetic therapy. These latter effects are usually mild to moderate (grade 1 to 2). The incidence of severe nausea and vomiting is around 4% each. Patients who have pre-existing or a history of severe vomiting may require antiemetic therapy before initiating temozolomide treatment. Temozolomide should be administered in the fasting state, at least one hour before a meal. Antiemetic therapy may be administered before or following administration of temozolomide.

Temozolomide is genotoxic, teratogenic and fetotoxic and should not be used during pregnancy.
Lactating women should discontinue nursing while receiving the drug because of the risk of secretion into breast milk.
One study indicated that women that have taken temozolomide without concomitant fertility preservation measures achieve pregnancy to a lesser rate later in life, but the study was too small to show statistical significance in the hypothesis that temozolomide would confer a risk of female infertility.
In male patients, temozolomide can have genotoxic effects. Men are advised not to father a child during or up to six months after treatment and to seek advice on cryoconservation of sperm prior to treatment, because of the possibility of irreversible infertility due to temozolomide therapy.

Very rarely temozolomide can cause acute respiratory failure or liver damage.

Interactions 

As temozolomide is not metabolized in the liver and has a low affinity to plasma proteins, it is expected to have a low potential for interactions. An analysis of patient data showed no interactions with a range of other drugs; the exception is valproic acid, which slightly slows down temozolomide elimination from the body. Combining the drug with other myelosuppressants may increase the risk of myelosuppression.

Pharmacology

Mechanism of action
The therapeutic benefit of temozolomide depends on its ability to alkylate/methylate DNA, which most often occurs at the N-7 or O-6 positions of guanine residues. This methylation damages the DNA and triggers the death of tumor cells. However, some tumor cells are able to repair this type of DNA damage, and therefore diminish the therapeutic efficacy of temozolomide, by expressing a protein O6-alkylguanine DNA alkyltransferase (AGT) encoded in humans by the O-6-methylguanine-DNA methyltransferase (MGMT) gene. In some tumors, epigenetic silencing of the MGMT gene prevents the synthesis of this enzyme, and as a consequence such tumors are more sensitive to killing by temozolomide. Conversely, the presence of AGT protein in brain tumors predicts poor response to temozolomide and these patients receive little benefit from chemotherapy with temozolomide.

Pharmacokinetics
Temozolomide is quickly and almost completely absorbed from the gut, and readily penetrates the blood–brain barrier; the concentration in the cerebrospinal fluid is 30% of the concentration in the blood plasma. Intake with food decreases maximal plasma concentrations by 33% and the area under the curve by 9%. Only 15% (10–20%) of the substance are bound to blood plasma proteins. Temozolomide is a prodrug; it is spontaneously hydrolyzed at physiological pH to 3-methyl-(triazen-1-yl)imidazole-4-carboxamide (MTIC), which further splits into monomethylhydrazine, likely the active methylating agent, and 5-aminoimidazole-4-carboxamide (AIC). Other metabolites include temozolomide acid and unidentified hydrophilic substances.

Plasma half-life is 1.8 hours. The substance and its metabolites are mainly excreted via the urine.

Chemical properties
Temozolomide is an imidazotetrazine derivative. It was recently discovered that temozolomide is an explosive, tentatively assigned as UN Class 1.

Mirroring its medicinal use as an alkylating antineoplastic agent, temozolomide has been reported to be a comparatively safe and stable in situ source of diazomethane in organic synthesis.  In particular, its use as a methylating and cyclopropanating reagent was demonstrated.

History
The agent was discovered by Simon Langdon, Niel Gibson, John Hickman, and Mike Tisdale of Aston University in Birmingham, England. The molecule was synthesised by PhD student Robert Stone, in a project directed by Malcolm Stevens to find anti-allergens. Its preclinical activity was reported in 1987 in Cancer Research. Stevens then directed its development with the late Edward Newlands at Charing Cross Hospital.

It was approved for medical use in the European Union in January 1999, and in the United States in August 1999. The intravenous formulation was approved in the United States in February 2009.

Research
Laboratory studies and clinical trials have started investigating the possibility of increasing the anticancer potency of temozolomide by combining it with other pharmacologic agents. For example, clinical trials have indicated that the addition of chloroquine might be beneficial for the treatment of glioma patients. Laboratory studies found that temozolomide killed brain tumor cells more efficiently when epigallocatechin gallate (EGCG), a component of green tea, was added; however, the efficacy of this effect has not yet been confirmed in brain-tumor patients. Preclinical studies reported in 2010 on investigations into the use of the novel oxygen diffusion-enhancing compound trans sodium crocetinate (TSC) when combined with temozolomide and radiation therapy and a clinical trial was underway .

While the above-mentioned approaches have investigated whether the combination of temozolomide with other agents might improve therapeutic outcome, efforts have also started to study whether altering the temozolomide molecule itself can increase its activity. One such approach permanently fused perillyl alcohol, a natural compound with demonstrated therapeutic activity in brain cancer patients, to the temozolomide molecule. The resultant novel compound, called NEO212 or TMZ-POH, revealed anticancer activity that was significantly greater than that of either of its two parent molecules, temozolomide and perillyl alcohol. Although , NEO212 has not been tested in humans, it has shown superior cancer therapeutic activity in animal models of glioma, melanoma, and brain metastasis of triple-negative breast cancer.

Because tumor cells that express the MGMT gene are more resistant to the effects of temozolomide, researchers investigated whether the inclusion of O6-benzylguanine (O6-BG), an AGT inhibitor, could overcome this resistance and improve the drug's therapeutic effectiveness. In the laboratory, this combination indeed showed increased temozolomide activity in tumor-cell culture in vitro and in animal models in vivo. However, a recently completed phase-II clinical trial with brain-tumor patients yielded mixed outcomes; while there was some improved therapeutic activity when O6-BG and temozolomide were given to patients with temozolomide-resistant anaplastic glioma, there seemed to be no significant restoration of temozolomide sensitivity in patients with temozolomide-resistant glioblastoma multiforme.

Some efforts focus on engineering hematopoietic stem cells expressing the MGMT gene prior to transplanting them into brain-tumor patients. This would allow for the patients to receive stronger doses of temozolomide, since the patient's hematopoietic cells would be resistant to the drug.

High doses of temozolomide in high-grade gliomas have low toxicity, but the results are comparable to the standard doses.

Two mechanisms of resistance to temozolomide effects have now been described: 1) intrinsic resistance conferred by MGMT deficiency (MGMTd) and 2) intrinsic or acquired resistance through MMR deficiency (MMRd). The MGMT enzyme is the first line of repair of mismatched bases created by TMZ. Cells are normally MGMT proficient (MGMTp) as they have an unmethylated MGMT promoter allowing the gene to be expressed normally. In this state, TMZ induced DNA damage is able to be efficiently repaired in tumor cells (and normal cells) by the active MGMT enzyme. Cells may grow and pass through the cell cycle normally without arrest or death. However, some tumors cells are MGMT deficient (MGMTd). This is most commonly due to abnormal methylation of the MGMT gene promoter and suppression of gene expression. MGMTd has also been described to occur by promoter rearrangement. In cells with MGMTd, DNA damage by TMZ activates the next stage of repair in cells with a proficient Mismatch Repair enzyme complex (MMRp). In MMRp the MMR protein complex identifies the damage and causes cells to arrest and undergo death which inhibits tumor growth. However, if cells have combined MGMTd and MMR deficiency (MGMTd + MMRd) then cells retain the induced mutations and continue to cycle and are resistant to effects of TMZ.

In gliomas and other cancers MMRd has now been reported to occur as primary MMRd (intrinsic or germline Lynch bMMRd) or as secondary MMRd (acquired - not present in the original untreated tumor). The latter occurs after effective treatment and cytoreduction of tumors with TMZ and then selection or induction of mutant MSH6, MSH2, MLH1, or PMS2 proteins and cells which are MMRd and TMZ resistant. The latter is described as an acquired resistance pathway with hotspot mutations in glioma patients (MSH6 p.T1219I). Other resistance pathways are also likely to exist.

References

Further reading

External links 
 
 

Cancer treatments
Carboxamides
DNA replication inhibitors
Fetotoxicants
Imidazotetrazines
Lactams
Merck & Co. brands
Prodrugs
Schering-Plough brands
Teratogens
Explosive chemicals
Alkylating antineoplastic agents
Methylating agents